Natutulog Pa ang Diyos (Filipino: "God Is Still Sleeping") is a 1988 Filipino film, which, in turn, is based on the original novel of the same name by Ruben R. Marcelino. It was remade in 2007 via Sineserye Presents.

Plot
Everyone notices how different Andrew (Ricky Davao) and Gillian (Lorna Tolentino) look from their respective sets of parents but no one really makes a fuss about it. What is even more surprising is that the two have never felt close with the families growing up. Instead, Gillian becomes more closely attached to Andrew's parents (Ricky Belmonte and Marita Zobel) while Andrew feels more drawn to Gillian's parents, Bernardo (Dante Rivero) and Patria (Gina Pareño). Little do they suspect that this is because Andrew and Gillian had been switched at birth. Andrew's real father, Bernardo, a poor private driver, decides that Andrew will have a better life growing up with his rich bosses. So he makes sure that only he and his wife Patria know that he has switched the two babies when the mothers both gave birth at a provincial hospital. No amount of pleading from Patria can make him change his mind. Out of frustration, Patria resorts to maltreating Gillian. The latter finds comfort with Andrew's mother, Rose, and later with Mark, (Gary Valenciano) a rich suitor. Jealous of Gillian's newfound attention, Andrew decides to force himself on Gillian, an act which leads to the revelation of the secret of their parentage.

Cast and characters

 Lorna Tolentino as Gillian Ramirez
 Ricky Davao as Andrew Velasco
 Gary Valenciano as Mark Vilchez
 Gina Pareño as Patria Ramirez
 Ricky Belmonte as Mike Velasco
 Tina Godinez as Tina Ramirez
 Michael Locsin as Boy Ramirez
 Dante Rivero as Bernardo Ramirez
 Marita Zobel as Rose Velasco

TV series

In 2007, Natutulog Pa ang Diyos was remade into a TV series with the title of Natutulog Ba ang Diyos? starring Roxanne Guinoo, Jake Cuenca, and Joross Gamboa.

External links
 

Tagalog-language films
1988 films
1988 drama films
Philippine drama films
Films based on Philippine novels
Films directed by Lino Brocka